The 1999 Speedway Grand Prix Qualification or GP Challenge was a series of motorcycle speedway meetings used to determine the 14 riders that qualified for the 1999 Speedway Grand Prix to join the other 8 riders that finished in the leading positions from the 1998 Speedway Grand Prix.

The format was similar to the previous year, in that 4 riders would qualify straight from the Intercontinental and Continental finals and 8 riders would qualify through the GP Challenge. The remaining two places would go to Billy Hamill and Robert Dados (world U21 champion) who were seeded through.

Leigh Adams won the GP Challenge.

Format
 First Round - 6 riders each from Sweden &  Denmark, 2 riders each from Finland & Norway to Scandinavian Final
 First Round - 32 riders from Continental quarter finals to Continental semi-finals
 First Round - 8 riders from British Final to Overseas Final
 First Round - 3 riders from Australian Final to Overseas Final
 First Round - 1 rider from New Zealand Final to Overseas Final
 First Round - 1 rider from South African Final to Overseas Final
 First Round - 3 riders from United States Final to Overseas Final
 Second Round - 8 riders from Scandinavian Final to Intercontinental Final
 Second Round - 8 riders from Overseas Final to Intercontinental Final
 Second Round - 16 riders from Continental semi-finals to Continental Final
 Third Round - 12 riders from positions 9-20 from the 1998 Grand Prix to GP Challenge
 Third Round - 2 riders from the Continental Final to 1999 Grand Prix and 5 to GP Challenge
 Third Round - 2 riders from the Intercontinental Final to 1999 Grand Prix and 6 to GP Challenge
 Final Round - 8 riders from the GP Challenge to the 1999 Grand Prix

First round

Continental quarter finals

Second round

Overseas Final
 8 riders to Intercontinental Final

Scandinavian Final
8 riders to Intercontinental final

Continental semi finals

Third round
12 riders from positions 9-20 from the 1998 Speedway Grand Prix to GP Challenge

Intercontinental Final
 2 riders direct to Grand Prix, 6 riders to GP Challenge

Continental Final 
2 riders direct to Grand Prix, 5 riders to GP Challenge
25 July 1998  Debrecen

Final Round

GP Challenge
8 riders to 1998 Grand Prix
3 October 1998  Pardubice

References 

Speedway Grand Prix Qualification
Speedway Grand Prix Qualifications
Qualification